Coenobita violascens is a species of land hermit crab from family Coenobitidae. It is native to the Indonesia, Nicobar Islands, Thailand, Cambodia, Philippines, and Tanzania.

References

Hermit crabs
Terrestrial crustaceans
Crustaceans described in 1862